The 2018 PBA All-Star Week is the annual all-star week of the Philippine Basketball Association (PBA)'s 2017–18 season being held on May 23 to 27, 2018 on three different venues covering Luzon (Batangas), Visayas (Iloilo) and Mindanao (Davao).

Mindanao leg

All-Star Game

Roster

 Carl Bryan Cruz was unable to participate.
 Jayson Castro started in place of Carl Bryan Cruz.
 Roger Pogoy was unable to participate.
 Kiefer Ravena started in place of Troy Rosario.
 Troy Rosario was unable to participate.

Game

Baser Amer was named as the game's MVP.

Luzon leg

Obstacle Challenge
This edition was exclusively only for big men (power forwards and centers).

Gabby Espinas replaced Yancy de Ocampo, who was unable to participate.

Three-Point Shootout
This year's shootout featured a new format. Each of the five racks now has two moneyballs, with the first and fifth balls being valued as two points. This was a departure from the previous years' feature of having an "all-moneyball rack". This also increased the maximum possible points to 35 from 34.

Gold represent current champion.

Slam Dunk Contest
This year's contest only featured four judges instead of the traditional five.

Gold represent the current champion.

Shooting Stars Challenge

All-Star Game

Roster

 Marc Pingris was unable to participate due to an ACL injury.
 Jayson Castro started in place of Marc Pingris.
 Ian Sangalang was unable to participate due to a wrist injury.
 Carl Bryan Cruz was unable to participate.
 Kiefer Ravena was unable to participate.

Game

Terrence Romeo was named as the game's MVP.

Visayas leg

Shooting Stars Challenge

All-Star Game

Roster

 Kiefer Ravena was unable to participate.
 Chris Ross started in place of Kiefer Ravena.
 Joe Devance was unable to participate due to a knee injury.
 Ronald Tubid played in place of Joe Devance.
 Carl Bryan Cruz was unable to participate.
 Allein Maliksi was unable to participate due to an injury.

Game

Jeff Chan was named as the game's MVP.

Logo making contest
The league launched a logo-making contest for the All-Star week on February 23, 2018. The winner of the contest will win an all-expense-paid trip for two to one of the All-Star week legs (Davao, Batangas or Iloilo).

On March 15, an entry by John Paul Limos was selected as the winner of the contest by a selection committee composed of Commissioner Willie Marcial, PBA Press Corps president Gerry Ramos and Magnolia Hotshots team manager Alvin Patrimonio. The winning entry however got disqualified the following day since the logo had a very similar look from the logo used by PlayPark All-Stars (an e-sports tournament).

On March 19, a new logo, designed by Jerome Allan Moreno was selected as the winner of the logo making contest.

See also
2017–18 PBA season
Philippine Basketball Association
Philippine Basketball Association All-Star Weekend

References

2018
All-Star Week
Sports in Iloilo
Sports in Batangas
Sports in Davao del Sur
Philippines men's national basketball team games